"Lokera" is a song recorded by Puerto Rican singers Rauw Alejandro and Lyanno with Puerto Rican rapper Brray. It was written by Alejandro, Lyanno, and Brray, while the production was handled by Mr. NaisGai, Alejandro, and Caleb Calloway. The song was released for digital download and streaming as a single by Sony Music Latin and Duars Entertainment on July 25, 2022.

Critical reception 
Upon release, "Lokera" was met with widely positive reviews from music critics. In his review for Latina, Lucas Villa described Alejandro and Lyanno as "a dream duo" with "alluring vocals" that makes the song "more irresistible". He added that "Alejandro will continue to rule the dance floor with 'Lokera' in his arsenal". An author of Monitor Latino labeled it "a theme for the party" and named Alejandro "one of the main exponents of urban music in recent years". Remezcla's Jeanette Hernandez described "Lokera" as "hot", while Alberto Palao Murcia from Los 40 named it a "collaboration full of rhythm".

Credits and personnel 
Credits adapted from Tidal.

 Rauw Alejandro associated performer, composer, lyricist, producer
 Lyanno associated performer, composer, lyricist
 Brray associated performer, composer, lyricist
 Slow Jamz producer
 Luis J González "Mr. NaisGai" producer
 Hector C. Lopez Jiménez "Caleb Calloway" producer
 Sensei Sound  mastering engineer
 José M. Collazo "Colla" mixing engineer
 Jorge E. Pizarro "Kenobi" recording engineer

Charts

Certifications

Release history

References 

2022 songs
2022 singles
Rauw Alejandro songs
Songs written by Rauw Alejandro
Sony Music Latin singles
Spanish-language songs